According to the early Christian bishop Epiphanius of Salamis (c. 315–403), Chaabou or Kaabu (Nabataean Aramaic: 𐢏𐢁𐢃𐢈 kʾbw) was a goddess in the Nabataean pantheon—a virgin who gave birth to the god Dusares. However, a few modern scholars claim without proof that Epiphanus may have mistaken the word ka'abu ("cube", etymologically related to the name of the Kaaba), referring to the stone blocks used by the Nabateans to represent Dusares and possibly other deities, for the proper name of a goddess. His report that Chaabou was a virgin was likely influenced by his desire to find a parallel to the Christian belief in the virgin birth of Jesus, and by the similarity of the words ka'bah and ka'ibah ("virgin") in Arabic, the native tongue of the Nabataeans.

See also
al-Lat

References

Nabataea
Arabian goddesses